The 31st CARIFTA Games was held in the Robinson National Stadium in Nassau, Bahamas, on March 30-April 1, 2002.   A report on the results was given.

Participation (unofficial)

Detailed result lists can be found on the CFPI and on the
"World Junior Athletics History" website.  An unofficial count
yields the number of about 346 athletes (208 junior (under-20) and 138 youth
(under-17)) from about 21 countries:  Antigua and Barbuda (4), Aruba (3),
Bahamas (67), Barbados (26), Belize (1), Bermuda (12), British Virgin Islands
(5), Cayman Islands (16), French Guiana (4), Grenada (30), Guadeloupe (17),
Guyana (3), Jamaica (64), Martinique (20), Netherlands Antilles (7), Saint
Kitts and Nevis (3), Saint Lucia (9), Saint Vincent and the Grenadines (1),
Trinidad and Tobago (36), Turks and Caicos Islands (13), US Virgin Islands (5).

Records

A total of 13 games records were set.

In the boys' U-20 category, Darrel Brown from Trinidad and Tobago again
set a new games record finishing the 100 metres in 10.22s (wind: 0.9 m/s).
Jamaican Greg Little finished the
400 metres hurdles in 50.85s.

In the girls' U-20 category, Shaunette Davidson from Jamaica jumped 1.84m
high.  As in the year 2000, Claudia Villeneuve from
Martinique set new records in shot put (15.75m) and discus throw (53.47m).

In the boys' U-17 category, Usain Bolt from Jamaica set three new records
of 21.12s (wind: -0.5 m/s) in 200 metres, 47.33s in 400 metres, and together
with the Jamaican 4x400 metres relay team in 3:18.88.  Further records were
set by James Baird from Antigua and Barbuda in 9:10.97 in the 3000 metres
event, and by Matthew Palmer from Jamaica in 13.14s (wind: -0.7 m/s) in
100 metres hurdles.

Finally, in the girls' U-20 category, Anneisha McLaughlin from Jamaica set
two new records: in a 200 metres heat, she finished in 23.03 seconds (wind:
-1.8 m/s), and as part of the Jamaican 4x400 metres team achieving 3:44.18.  
LaToya Heath from Jamaica jumped 11.58 (wind: 0.8 m/s) in triple jump.

Austin Sealy Award

The Austin Sealy Trophy for the
most outstanding athlete of the games was awarded to Anneisha McLaughlin from Jamaica.  She won 3 gold medals (100m, 200m, and 4 × 400 m relay) in the youth (U-17) category.

Medal summary
Medal winners are published by category: Boys under 20 (Junior), Girls under 20 (Junior), Boys under 17 (Youth), and Girls under 17 (Youth).
Complete results can be found on the CFPI and the "World Junior Athletics History"
website.

Boys under 20 (Junior)

: Open event for both junior and youth athletes.

Girls under 20 (Junior)

: Open event for both junior and youth athletes.

Boys under 17 (Youth)

Girls under 17 (Youth)

Medal table (unofficial)

References

External links
World Junior Athletics History

CARIFTA Games
International athletics competitions hosted by the Bahamas
CARIFTA Games
CARIFTA Games